Kate St John (born October 2, 1957) is an English composer, arranger, producer and multi-instrumentalist. Classically trained on oboe, she gained a music degree at City University London. Her first band was The Ravishing Beauties with Virginia Astley and Nicky Holland. The trio joined The Teardrop Explodes in Liverpool during the winter of 1981 for a series of dates at small clubs and a UK tour in early 1982. During the 1980s and early 1990s, she was a member of The Dream Academy with Nick Laird-Clowes and Gilbert Gabriel. In 1985 they had a worldwide hit with "Life In A Northern Town" and produced three albums: The Dream Academy (1985), Remembrance Days (1987) and A Different Kind Of Weather (1990). In the 1990s St. John was a member of Van Morrison's live band playing oboe and saxophone. She played on five Van Morrison albums. In 1994 she co-wrote and sang on 4 tracks with Roger Eno on the album The Familiar on the All Saints Label. This led to the formation of Channel Light Vessel, a band with Kate, Roger Eno, Bill Nelson, Laraaji and Mayumi Tachibana.
St John has released two solo albums: Indescribable Night (1995) and Second Sight (1997).

She has played and toured with many artists including Van Morrison, Julian Cope, The Waterboys, Damon Albarn, Marianne Faithfull, Strawberry Switchblade and Morrissey.

Since 2005 she has specialised in being a Musical Director for multi-artist shows including working with Joe Boyd on the Way To Blue tributes to Nick Drake, Hal Wilner on his Rogues Gallery, Nino Rota concerts, Blood and Roses Tribute to Ewan MacColl, Bright Phoebus Revisited and the Imagining Ireland/Imagining Home concerts in 2016 at The National Concert Hall in Dublin and The Royal Festival Hall (London). She is also a string and woodwind arranger.

Kate and her husband and writing partner, Neill MacColl, specialise in On Set music production in films, having worked on Far From The Madding Crowd (2015), Tulip Fever (2017), My Cousin Rachel (2017), The Little Stranger (2018) and Dirt Music (in post-production)

Music director 

2016: Imagining Ireland/Imagining Home at The Dublin Concert Hall and Royal Festival Hall for the centenary of the 1916 Easter Rising and the interplay of Irish/English music: Paul Brady, Andy Irvine, Kevin Rowland, Martin Carthy, Cait O'Riordan, Declan O'Rourke, Camille O'Sullivan, Steve Nieve and Roger Eno.

2015: Blood and Roses: A tribute to Ewan MacColl shows: Peggy Seeger, Neill and Calum MacColl, Chaim Tannenbaum, Seth Lakeman, Jarvis Cocker, Paul Buchanan, Norma Waterson, Eliza and Martin Carthy, Dick Gaughan, Karine Polwart, The Unthanks

2013: Hal Wilner's Amarcord Nino Rota Tribute. The Barbican: Carla Bley, Mike Gibbs, Steve Beresford, Steven Bernstein, Rita Marcotulli, Giancarlo Vulcano, Richard Strange, John Etheridge, and Karen Mantler.

2013: Bright Phoebus Revisited Tour: Marry and Norma Waterson, Martin and Eliza Carthy, Richard Hawley, John Smith, Jarvis Cocker, Bob Davenport and Kami Thompson

2010: An Evening of Political Song for Richard Thompson's Meltdown at The Royal Festival Hall: Harry Shearer, Richard Thompson, Tom Robinson, Emily Smith, Jez Lowe,  Norma Waterson, Martin and Eliza Carthy, Boris Grebenshikov, Camille O'Sullivan, Claribel Alegria and Chaim Tannenbaum

2009-2016: Way To Blue: A tribute to Nick Drake series of concerts: Joe Boyd and Danny Thompson in the UK, Italy and Australia with Green Gartside, Scott Matthews, Lisa Hannigan, Vashti Bunyan, Robyn Hitchcock, Teddy Thompson, Sam Beam, Glen Hansard, Sam Lee, The Rails, Harper Simon, Luluc, Shane Nicholson, Martha Wainwright, Beth Orton, Stuart Murdoch, Camille O'Sullivan

2009:A Not So Silent Night, A Wainwright Family Christmas at The Albert Hall: Kate and Anna McGarrigle, Rufus and Martha Wainwright, Guy Garvey, Boy George and others

2008-2010: Hal Wilner's Rogues Gallery Sea Shanty shows in the UK and Sydney: Lou Reed, Tim Robbins, Shane MacGowan, Todd Rundgren, Ralph Steadman, Neil Hannon, The Unthanks, Teddy Thompson, Peaches and others

2008: The Thompson Family Reunion Christmas Show: Teddy, Kami, Richard and Linda Thompson, Bert Jansch, Kathryn Williams, Brendan Campbell, Bob Davenport, Jenni Muldaur, The Unthanks, Justin Bond and Shlomo.

2005-2007: The Folk Britannia Daughters of Albion series of concerts: June Tabor, Norma Waterson, Martin and Eliza Carthy, Lou Rhodes, Kathryn Williams, Lisa Knapp

Notes

External links 
www.katestjohn.co.uk
[ Kate St. John @ Allmusic]

1957 births
Living people
English composers
English women singers
English accordionists
English women pianists
Cor anglais players
English oboists
The Dream Academy members
All Saints Records artists
Women oboists
21st-century accordionists
21st-century English women musicians
21st-century pianists
21st-century women pianists